José Salas Valdés was a Spanish sailor of the late 18th century. He was an explorer of the Americas and Pacific. In 1793 he set out on a voyage of the South Pacific.

References

Spanish sailors
18th-century Spanish people
Spanish explorers of the Pacific